Sir David James Wallace, CBE, FRS, FRSE, FREng  (born 7 October 1945) is a British physicist and academic. He was the Vice-Chancellor of Loughborough University from 1994 to 2005, and the Master of Churchill College, Cambridge from 2006 to 2014.

Early life and education
Wallace was born on 7 October 1945.  He was educated at Hawick High School in Hawick, Borders, Scotland and went to the University of Edinburgh where he earned a degree in Mathematical Physics and a PhD in Elementary particle theory, under the supervision of Peter Higgs.

Career
After postdoctoral research work as a Harkness Fellow at Princeton University, Wallace became a physics lecturer at the University of Southampton in 1972.

In 1979 he became the fourth Tait Professor of Mathematical Physics at the University of Edinburgh, succeeding Nicholas Kemmer. He won the James Clerk Maxwell Medal and Prize in 1980. He became Director of the Edinburgh Parallel Computing Centre (EPCC) and in 1996 he was appointed a CBE for his computing work.

Wallace is currently Vice-President for Physical Sciences of the Royal Society of Edinburgh, of which he was made a Fellow of in 1982. He was formerly Vice-President and Treasurer of the Royal Society and Chair of the Council for the Mathematical Sciences. From 1994 to January 2006 he was the Vice-Chancellor of Loughborough University. From 2006 to 2011 he was the Director of the Isaac Newton Institute for Mathematical Sciences in Cambridge. Wallace has also been President of the Institute of Physics and Deputy Lieutenant of Leicestershire. He was elected a Fellow of the Royal Academy of Engineering in 1998, and was a commissioner of the Royal Commission for the Exhibition of 1851 from 2001-2011.

In 2014, the Department of Mathematical Sciences at Loughborough University launched a series of public lectures honouring  Wallace. The Sir David Wallace lectures are hosted by the University. Speakers have included Cédric Villani and Michael Berry (physicist).

Personal
He has a wife, Elizabeth and a daughter, Sara.

References

External links
Cam.ac.uk: "Master Appointed to Churchill College
Number-10.gov.uk: "Master Of Churchill College, Cambridge" (via The National Archives, UK)

University of Cambridge: "Director of the Isaac Newton Institute for Mathematical Sciences appointed"

Fellows of the Royal Society
Fellows of the Royal Academy of Engineering
Vice-Chancellors of Loughborough University
Princeton University alumni
Scottish mathematicians
Scottish scholars and academics
Scottish physicists
Harkness Fellows
Fellows of Churchill College, Cambridge
Masters of Churchill College, Cambridge
Alumni of the University of Edinburgh
Academics of the University of Edinburgh
Academics of the University of Southampton
Commanders of the Order of the British Empire
Deputy Lieutenants of Leicestershire
People from Hawick
1945 births
Living people
Presidents of the Institute of Physics
Maxwell Medal and Prize recipients
People educated at Hawick High School
Knights Bachelor